Afrocyon is an extinct genus of large, mostly carnivorous bone-crushing mammals known as bear dogs, of the family Amphicyonidae endemic to Africa during the Miocene to Pliocene living from 11.6—5.3 Ma and existed for approximately .

Taxonomy
Afrocyon was named by Arambourg (1961). It was assigned to Amphicyonidae by Carroll (1988).

References

Prehistoric carnivoran genera
Miocene bear dogs
Miocene mammals of Africa
Pliocene carnivorans
Pliocene extinctions
Pliocene mammals of Africa